"United" is a song recorded by Dominican–American reggae/ragga recording artist Prince Ital Joe and American rapper Marky Mark. It was released in March 1994 as the third single from their debut album, Life in the Streets (1994). It was co-written and produced by Alex Christensen and Frank Peterson. The single reached number one in Germany and the top 10 in Austria, Denmark, Finland, Lithuania, the Netherlands, Sweden, and Switzerland.

Critical reception
Alan Jones from Music Week gave the song four out of five. He wrote, "Number one in Germany, this catchy confection combines Ital Joe's Haddaway and Dr. Alban influences with Marky Mark's streetwise rapping. A substantial hit." He later added, "This is an anthemic German production pairing the patois of Prince Ital and a more conventional Marky Mark rap with a big chorus. Don't underestimate the potential of a record which has now been huge all over Europe, and consequently exposed to million of British holidaymakers." James Hamilton from the RM Dance Update deemed it a "Boney M-ish chant-along cheesy German smash".

Music video
The accompanying music video for the song features Prince Ital Joe and Marky Mark being chauffeured around predominantly rough neighborhoods of New York City in a Mercedes-Benz 600 Pullmann limousine. This footage is interspersed with a second storyline showing a mixed-race couple reuniting after the female partner has apparently moved out of their apartment. The video was A-listed on Germany's VIVA.

Track listings
 CD maxi - Europe (1994)	
 "United" (Radio Edit) - 4:02
 "United" (Extended Version) - 5:59
 "United" (United Mix) - 5:29
 "In The 90's" - 3:17

Charts

Weekly charts

Year-end charts

References

1994 singles
1994 songs
Eurodance songs
Mark Wahlberg songs
Number-one singles in Germany
Number-one singles in Israel
Prince Ital Joe songs
Song recordings produced by Alex Christensen
Song recordings produced by Frank Peterson
Songs written by Alex Christensen
Songs written by Frank Peterson
Songs written by Mark Wahlberg